Sven Anders Viktor Lundquist (24 March 1920 – 3 September 2007) was a Swedish sport shooter. He won a bronze medal in 25 metre rapid fire pistol at the 1948 Summer Olympics in London.

References

1920 births
2007 deaths
People from Borås
Swedish male sport shooters
Shooters at the 1948 Summer Olympics
Olympic shooters of Sweden
Olympic bronze medalists for Sweden
Olympic medalists in shooting
Medalists at the 1948 Summer Olympics
Sportspeople from Västra Götaland County
20th-century Swedish people